Kenneth Moraleda (born 17 April 1973) is an actor.

Of Filipino descent, Moraleda was born in Cambridge, Massachusetts, and has lived in Seattle, the Philippines, Los Angeles and is now based in Sydney, Australia. Moraleda trained at Australian Theatre for Young People (ATYP) before being accepted into the prestigious National Institute of Dramatic Art (NIDA) graduating with a Bachelor of Acting in 1995.

Moraleda's first lead in a feature film is the role of Arun in Lucky Miles directed by Michael James Rowland. Other film roles include Monsod in Miramax's The Great Raid directed by John Dahl and Tony in the short film Sweet and Sour.

Numerous television credits include playing Tim Young in the SBS series Bondi Banquet, Michael Lee in City Life for South Pacific Pictures and appearances on Water Rats, Wildside, White Collar Blue, Comedy Inc., Playhouse Disney and Jay's Jungle.

Notable theatre credits include creating the role of Roger Chan in Nick Enright's A Man With Five Children for the Sydney Theatre Company directed by George Ogilvie and most recently playing Banzai in the Australian/Asian Tour of Disney's The Lion King directed by Julie Taymor.

He won the Vic Silayan Award for best actor (Lucky Miles) in the 10th 2008 Cinemanila International Film Festival at Malacañan Palace's Kalayaan Hall.

References

External links

1973 births
Living people
Male actors from Cambridge, Massachusetts
American male film actors
American male television actors
American male actors of Filipino descent